Pétanque (also  or ) is a sport that falls into the category of boules sports, along with raffa, bocce, boule lyonnaise, lawn bowls, and crown green bowling. In all of these sports, players or teams play their boules/balls towards a target ball.

In pétanque the objective is to score points by having boules closer to the target than the opponent after all boules have been thrown. This is achieved by throwing or rolling boules closer to the small target ball, officially called a jack (fr: cochonnet), or by hitting the opponents' boules away from the target, while standing inside a circle with both feet on the ground.

The game is normally and best played on hard dirt or gravel. It can be played in public areas in parks or in dedicated facilities called boulodromes.

The current form of the game was codified in 1907 or 1910 in La Ciotat, in Provence, France. The French name pétanque (borrowed into English, with or without the acute accent) comes from petanca in the Provençal dialect of the Occitan language, deriving from the expression pè tancat , meaning 'foot fixed' or 'foot planted' (on the ground).

History

Invention of the game 
Boules games have a very long history, dating back through the Middle Ages to ancient Rome, and before that to ancient Greece and Egypt.

In France in the second half of the 19th century, a form of boules known as jeu provençal (or boule lyonnaise) was extremely popular. In this form of the game, players rolled their boules or ran three steps before throwing a boule. Pétanque originally developed as an offshoot or variant of jeu provençal in 1910, in what is now called the Jules Lenoir Boulodrome in the town of La Ciotat near Marseilles. A former jeu provençal player named Jules Lenoir was afflicted by rheumatism so severe that he could no longer run before throwing a boule. In fact, he could barely stand. A good friend named Ernest Pitiot was a local café owner. In order to accommodate his friend Lenoir, Pitiot developed a variant form of the game in which the length of the pitch or field was reduced by roughly half, and a player, instead of running to throw a boule, stood, stationary, in a circle. They called the game pieds tanqués, "feet planted" (on the ground), a name that eventually evolved into the game's current name, pétanque.

The first pétanque tournament was organized by Ernest Pitiot, along with his brother Joseph Pitiot, in 1910 in La Ciotat. The game spread quickly and soon became the most popular form of boules in France.

Before the mid-1800s, European boules games were played with solid wooden balls, usually made from boxwood root, a very hard wood. The late 1800s saw the introduction of cheap mass-manufactured nails, and wooden boules gradually began to be covered with nails, producing boules cloutées ("nailed boules"). After World War I, cannonball manufacturing technology was adapted to allow the manufacture of hollow, all-metal boules. The first all-metal boule, la Boule Intégrale, was introduced in the mid-1920s by Paul Courtieu. The Intégrale was cast in a single piece from a bronze-aluminum alloy. Shortly thereafter, Jean Blanc invented a process of manufacturing steel boules by stamping two steel blanks into hemispheres and then welding the two hemispheres together to create a boule. With this technological advance, hollow all-metal balls rapidly became the norm.

Global spread of the game 

After the development of the all-metal boule, pétanque spread rapidly from Provence to the rest of France, then to the rest of Europe, and then to Francophone colonies and countries around the globe. Today, many countries have their own national governing bodies.

In France, the Fédération Française de Pétanque et Jeu Provençal ( FFPJP) has over 300,000 licensed members.

There are strong national federations in Germany, Spain and England. Pétanque is actively played in many nations with histories of French colonial influence, especially in Southeast Asia, including Laos, Thailand, Vietnam, Cambodia and Puducherry in India, as well as some parts of Africa. The sport is also popular in Madagascar and Thailand.

Pétanque was featured at the 2015 All-Africa Games hosted by the Republic of the Congo, a former French colony.

Pétanque is not widely played in the Americas. There is a Canadian pétanque federation based in Québec. In the United States, the Federation of Pétanque USA (FPUSA) reports that about 30,000 play nationwide. As of 1 December 2015, FPUSA counted 2141 members in the US, in 52 affiliated clubs.

On the international level, the governing body of pétanque is the Fédération Internationale de Pétanque et Jeu Provençal (FIPJP). It was founded in 1958 in Marseille and has almost 800,000 members as of 2022.

In popular culture  
The game made an appearance in the 1966 French crime film Le deuxieme souffle. Pétanque also appeared in Season 4 Episode 20 (Pétanque) of the American sitcom The Cosby Show in 1988. In the 1981 film adaptation of the Agatha Christie mystery Evil Under the Sun, a suspect played by James Mason is questioned about his alibi while playing a game. The fourth episode of The Amazing Race 30 featured a pétanque competition at Place des Lices in Saint-Tropez. Asterix Versus Caesar features the Gauls playing a pétanque-esque game with rocks.

National and international competitions 

There are a number of important world championship tournaments.

The FIPJP world championships take place every two years. Men's championships are held in even-numbered years, while Women's and Youth championships are held in odd-numbered years.

Perhaps the best-known international championship is the Mondial la Marseillaise à Pétanque, which takes place every year in Marseille, France, with more than 10,000 participants and more than 150,000 spectators.

The largest annual tournament in the United States is the Petanque Amelia Island Open (formerly the Petanque America Open), held in each year in November at Amelia Island, Florida.

La British Open is a major Pétanque tournament held in the North of England which attracts players from across the United Kingdom and Europe.

Pétanque is not currently an Olympic sport, although the Confédération Mondiale des Sports de Boules—which was created in 1985 by several international boules organizations specifically for this purpose—has been lobbying the Olympic committee since 1985 to make it part of the summer Olympics. Pétanque has appeared in every edition of The World Games from 1985 onward. The 2022 World Games in the United States will include women’s pétanque, the first time that only women's events will be held as part of the boules sports programme at The World Games.

Playing the game
Based on the rules of the Fédération Internationale de Pétanque & Jeu Provençal.

Equipment 
Pétanque is played by two teams, each comprising one, two, or three players. In the singles and doubles games, each player plays with three metal boules. In triples, each player uses only two.

The area where a game of pétanque is played is called a terrain. A game can be played in an open area such as a public park, where the boundaries of the terrain are not marked, or more formally on a "marked terrain" where the terrain boundaries are marked (traditionally, by strings tightly strung between nails driven into the ground).

In pétanque, players throw while standing in a circle (cercle). Traditionally, this was simply scratched in the dirt. From around 2005, red plastic "prefabricated" circles were introduced and are now widely used in formal games.

The "ends"
A game consists of several "ends" (mènes). An end consists of the throwing out of the jack (cochonnet, the little wooden target ball), followed by the two teams throwing their boules. After both teams have thrown all of their boules, the team with the boule closest to the jack wins the end. The winning team scores one point for each of its boules that is closer than the opposing team's closest boule. That means that the winning team could in theory score as many as six points in an end, although a score of one or two points is more typical. As the game progresses, each team accumulates points until one of the teams reaches 13, the winning number of points.

Order of play

A game begins with a coin toss to determine which team plays first. A player from the team that threw the jack throws the first boule. Then a player from the opposing team throws a boule. From that point on, the team with the boule that is closest to the jack is said to "have the point". The team that does not have the point throws the next boule. That team continues to throw boules until it either gains the point, or runs out of boules.

If at any point the closest boules from each team are equidistant from the jack, then the team that threw the last boule throws again. If the boules are still equidistant then the teams play alternately until the tie is broken. If the boules are still equidistant at the end of the mène then neither team scores any points.

The team that won the end starts the next end. A player from the winning team places (or draws) a circle around the jack. The player then picks up the jack, stands in the circle, and throws the jack to start the next end.

Scoring 

 

An end is complete when both teams have played all of their boules, or when the jack is knocked out of play (goes "dead").

If the end finishes in the usual way—with the jack still live and one team with the closest boule—then the team with the closest boule wins the end and scores one point for each of its boules that is closer to the jack than other team's closest boule.

If the jack is live but there is an "equidistant boules" situation at the end of the mène, then neither team scores any points. If the jack is dead at the finish of the end, then if one (and only one) team still has boules left to play, that team scores one point for each boule that it still has in hand. Otherwise neither team scores any points in the end (like an inning in baseball in which neither team scores any runs).

Miscellaneous rules

Boules can be thrown in any way that the player wishes, but the traditional way is to hold the boule with the palm of the hand downwards, and then to throw with an under-arm swing of the arm ending in an upward flick of the wrist. Throwing this way puts backspin on the boule and gives the player the maximum amount of control and flexibility when throwing.
The boule can be rolled, thrown to a moderate height, or even thrown to a great height (a high lob or portée).
Players usually carry a tape measure for measuring close points.
On a terrain with boundaries marked with strings, a boule or jack must completely cross the boundary string before it is considered to be out-of-bounds and dead.

Equipment specifications

Boules 
Leisure boules are boules that do not meet the FIPJP standards for competition boules, but are less expensive than competition boules and completely adequate for "backyard" games. Unlike competition boules, leisure boules are a "one size fits all" affair—they come in one weight and size.

Competition boules must meet specifications set by the FIPJP. When purchasing competition boules, a purchaser has a choice of a number of characteristics, including the size, weight, and hardness of the boules, as well as the striations (patterned grooves on the surface of the boules).

Jack 
The jack, or target ball, is a small ball made of wood, traditionally boxwood or beechwood,  in diameter. In the past, jacks were often left "natural"—unfinished or with a clear finish—but nowadays they are often painted in bright colours. In French, the jack is known by a variety of names, including but (goal or target), cochonnet (piglet), bouchon ("little ball" in provençal language, not related to the French word "bouchon" that designates a bottle stopper), le petit (the little one), and gari ("rat", also in provençal language).

Playing area

Pétanque can be played on almost any flat, open space. The ground may be irregular and interrupted by trees or rocks, and the surface is likely to be uneven, with some areas hard and smooth and other areas rough and stony. When an area is constructed specifically for the purposes of playing pétanque, the playing surface is typically loose gravel, decomposed granite, brick grog or crushed sea shell. Sandy beaches are not suitable, although light plastic boules are sometimes used to adapt the game for the beach. There is no requirement for backboards or sideboards (as in bocce), but dedicated playing areas are often enclosed in boards or some other structural barrier.

In France, village squares and park pathways are often used as pétanque playing areas. In addition, many towns have recreational facilities (boulodromes) constructed specifically for playing pétanque.

An area where a single pétanque game is played is called a terrain. A "playing area" (aire de jeu) is an area containing one or more terrains. For tournaments, a large playing area is subdivided and marked off (typically using nails and string) into rectangular marked terrains (also known as "lanes" (cadres) or "pistes") so that multiple games may be carried on simultaneously.

Strategy

Pointing and shooting 
Generally speaking, a player throws a boule with one of two objectives:
 To make the boule come to rest in a particular spot, usually as close as possible to the jack. This is called pointing.
 To make the boule directly hit an opponent's boule with the aim of knocking it away from the jack. This is called shooting.

The best throw is called a carreau. It is a shot that knocks away the opponent's boule, leaving the thrown boule exactly in its place.

Players who are skilful enough to shoot effectively are called 'shooters' (tireurs); players who usually point are called 'pointers' (pointeurs) As a matter of strategy, pointers play first and shooters are held in reserve in case the opponents place well. Good pointing is what scores points, but national and international championships are usually dominated by skilful shooters, who target any opposing boule that comes close to scoring.

Throwing a boule
Some strategic considerations involved in the throw of a boule include:

 A traditional maxim is boule devant, boule d'argent ("A ball in front is a money ball."). A boule located closer to the player than the jack ("in front of the jack") is much more valuable than one behind the jack. A boule in front blocks the opposing team from easy access to the jack, and it may also (intentionally or accidentally) be hit and pushed closer to the jack.
 If a player points a boule very close to the jack, it forces the opposing shooter to shoot it immediately. This may prove to be a disadvantage to a pointer who wants to keep that boule, or it can be advantageous if the pointer is trying to force the opposing shooter to exhaust their supply of boules.
 It is generally a bad idea for a player to shoot with their team's last boule. In most cases, the better strategy is to "limit the damage" by pointing the team's last boule close enough to the jack to limit the opposing team's gains to a single point.

Throwing the jack
Strategic considerations involved in the throw of the jack include:

 Throw the jack to a distance at which your own shooter is most comfortable, or the opposing shooter is least comfortable. 
 Aim for a location on the terrain that your own pointers prefer, or that might be difficult for the opposing team's pointers.
 Disorient the opposing team by refusing to get in a rut. At each opportunity, throw the jack to a new position on the terrain, and alternate long and short distances.

Glossary of special terms 
In the following glossary, the French word or phrase is given in brackets unless it is the same:
join battle (arriver a bataille). When both teams have 10 or 11 points and the game may go either way on each lead. 
bombard. To shoot or strike an opponent's boules one after another, after they had taken the lead.
boule devant, boule d'argent. "A ball in front is a money ball". This maxim reminds players that when pointing, the most valuable place for a boule is in front of the jack. In that location, it prevents opponents from throwing directly toward the jack, and hitting it will push it even closer to the jack.
 jack (but, also bouchon, cochonnet, petit, gari or kiki). The small wooden or plastic target ball.
 carambolage Shot that knocks away several boules. Literally "pile-up".
 circle (cercle or rond). The marked area from within which the boules are thrown.
demarquer ("unscore"). To drop a point when pointing or shooting.
fuser. A boule that bounces off course.
have the point. A team is said to "have the point" if one of its boules is closer to the jack than any of the opposing team's boules. A team that has the point is basically in a winning position, so the team that does NOT have the point throws the next boule and attempts to gain the point.
mene. "End" i.e. the period of play from the throw of a jack to the point when both teams have played all their boules.
point To throw one's boule with the intent of stopping near the jack (also known as placing). Video: 20 best points from the Masters de Pétanque 2017
pousette. A shot that pushes one's team's boules nearer the jack; or to that pushes the jack.
shoot To throw one's boule at an opponent's boule (or at the jack) in an attempt to knock it out of play. When the opposing team has a boule positioned very close to the jack, often the best strategy is to attempt to shoot it. A team in a desperate situation may attempt to save itself by shooting the jack out of bounds. Video: 20 best shots from the Masters de Pétanque 2017
lob (portée) A boule thrown in a high arc so that when it lands it only rolls a short distance. Video: Marco Foyot demonstrates the high lob.
carreau (pronounced carrow). A shot that knocks an opposing boule away from the jack and replaces it (in very nearly the same spot) with the thrower's own boule. Basically, the perfect shot. Video: Diego Rizzi demonstrates a perfect carreau.

fanny (mettre fanny). To lose a game without scoring any points; a shutout game. When a player loses 13 to 0, he is said to fanny ("il est fanny", he's fanny, or "il a fait fanny", he made fanny) and must kiss the bottom of a girl named Fanny. Virtually everywhere in Provence where pétanque is played, you will find a picture, woodcarving, or pottery figure of a bare-bottomed young woman named Fanny. Often, the team that "made fanny" has to buy a round of drinks for the winning team ("Fanny paie à boire !", "the fanny pays for the drinks!").

Image gallery

See also
 Boules
 Bocce
 Boccia
 Curling
 Kubb, a Swedish throwing game
 Bowls
 Bolas criollas
 Pétanque World Championships
 Mondial la Marseillaise à Pétanque
 Swedish pétanque championships
 Tejo

References 

Petanque International Games (UK)

External links 

 FIPJP - Fédération Internationale de Pétanque et Jeu Provençal is the international governing body for pétanque. Its web site contains a variety of useful information, including the official international rules of pétanque and a list of its national members.
 CEP - Confédération Européenne de Pétanque (CEP) is the European Governing body for Pétanque.
 FFPJP - Fédération Francais de Pétanque et Jeu Provençal is the governing body for Pétanque in France, and the most important national member of FIPJP.
 Pétanque England, the governing body for Pétanque in England and member of the FIPJP.
 FPUSA - Federation of Petanque U.S.A. is the governing body for Pétanque in the United States and member of FIPJP.

 
Ball games
Provence
Lawn games
Throwing sports
Sports originating in France
Team sports
Boules